The Metropolitan Museum of Art holds in its collection an Armenian reliquary cross dating to the 18th century. Crafted from a variety of valuable materiel, the cross was made for the Monastery of St. George at Lim in Western Armenia. The piece is inscribed with a warning, reading  "Whoever dares to give it [the relic] as a pledge or take it away from Saint George, let them incur his vengeance."

References

See also 
Armenian Gospel with Silver Cover
Metalwork of the Metropolitan Museum of Art
Armenia–United States relations